Kalaratri (sometimes spelled Kaalratri) is the seventh of the nine Navadurga forms of the mother Goddess Mahadevi. She is first referenced in the Devi Mahatmya. Kalaratri is one of the fearsome forms of the Mother Goddess.

It is not uncommon to find the names, Kali and Kalaratri being used interchangeably, although these two deities are argued to be separate entities by some. Kali is first mentioned in Hinduism as a distinct goddess around 300 BCE, in the Mahabharata which is thought to have been written between the 5th and 2nd centuries BCE (with oral transmission possible to be dated to a much earlier time period, but impossible to verify).  

Kaalratri is traditionally worshipped during the nine nights of Navratri celebrations.
The seventh day of Navratri pooja (Hindu prayer ritual) in particular is dedicated to her and she is considered the fiercest form of the Mother Goddess, her appearance itself invoking fear. This form of Goddess is believed to be the destroyer of all demon entities, ghosts, evil spirits and negative energies, who flee upon knowing of her arrival.

The Saudhikagama, an ancient Tantric text from 
Orissa referenced in the Silpa Prakasha, describes Goddess Kalaratri as being the goddess that rules the night portion of every day and night.  She is also associated with the crown chakra (also known as the sahasrara chakra), thereby giving the invoker, siddhis and niddhis (particularly, knowledge, power and wealth).

Kaalratri is also known as Shubankari (शुभंकरी) - meaning auspicious/doing good in Sanskrit, due to the belief that she always provides auspicious results to her devotees.  Hence, it is believed that she makes her devotees fearless.

Other less well-known names of Goddess Kaalratri include Raudri and Dhumorna.

Scriptural References

Mahabharata

One of the earlier references to Goddess Kaalratri is found in the Mahabharata (dated by the text itself to have occurred between 3137 BC - 3067 BC but not believed to have been actually written down until, at the earliest the late 5th century, with additions and alterations continuing on through the 1st century BCE), specifically in the Sauptika Parva (Book of Sleeping), the tenth book of eighteen Parva epic. Post the historic battle between the Pandavas and Kauravas, Ashwatthama, the son of Dronacharya vows to avenge the death of his father. Going against the rules of war in the stealth of the night, he creeps into the Kuru camp dominated by the followers of the victorious Pandavas. With the power of Rudra, he attacks and kills the followers in their sleep.

During his frenzied assaults on the followers, Kaalratri appears on the spot.

“.....in her embodied form, a black image, of bloody mouth and bloody eyes, wearing crimson garlands and smeared with crimson unguents, attired in a single piece of red cloth, with a noose in hand, and resembling an elderly lady, employed in chanting a dismal note and standing full before their eyes.”  This reference in the Mahabharata appropriately depicts Goddess Kaalratri as representing and personifying the horrors of war, laying its unpleasantness bare.

Markandeya Purana

Chapter 1 of the Durga Saptashati, verse 75, references the destructive concept personified by Goddess Kaalratri in all Puranas:prakṛtistvaṃca sarvasya guṇatraya vibhāvinī kāḷarātrirmahārātrirmoharātriśca dāruṇāYou are the primordial cause of everythingBringing into force the three qualities (sattva, rajas and tamas)You are the dark might of periodic dissolutionYou are the great night of final dissolution and the terrible night of delusion

Skanda Purana

The Skanda Purana describes Lord Shiva beseeching his wife, Parvati (the cosmic feminine creative force), to help the gods when they are terrorised by the demon-king, Durgamasur (NB: distinct from Goddess Durga, who is so-named for having killed this very demon). She accepts to help and sends Goddess Kaalratri, "...a female whose beauty bewitched the inhabitants of the three worlds...". Some sources claim that the Skanda Purana describes the Mother Goddess as Parvati (Durga) removing her golden skin, to reveal her darker Kaalratri form.

Devi-Bhagavata Purana

After Goddess Ambika (also known as Kaushiki and Chandika) comes forth from the body of Goddess Parvati, Parvati’s skin turns extremely dark (almost black, like the hue of dark clouds). Therefore Parvati is given the names ‘Kalika’ and ‘Kalaratri’. She’s described as having two arms, holding a scimitar and half broken skull (that acts as a bowl to collect blood), and she eventually kills the demon king, Shumbha. This version in the Devi Bhagwatam is quite different than the one mentioned in the Mahatmyam.

Varaha Purana

In this text, the name Raudri is used to reference Kaalratri. Chapters 90-96 describe Goddess Raudri (Kaalratri) killing the demon, Ruru.

Vishnudharmottara Purana

Regarded as an appendix to Vishnu Purana, this encyclopaedic narrative makes reference to Goddess Kaalratri in the 48th adhyaya (chapter) of the third khanda (part), as being Dumordhana, the feminine counterpart to Lord Yama, the god of death.

Other scriptural references to Goddess Kaalratri include - the Lalita sahasranama storam (found in the Brahmanda Purana) and Lakshmi sahasranama stotram.

Etymology

The first part of the word kalaratri is kala. Kala primarily means time but also means black in honour of being the first creation before light itself. This is a masculine noun in Sanskrit. Time, as perceived by Vedic seers, is where everything takes place; the framework on which all creation unfolds. Vedic seers therefore conceived of kala as a powerful deity as much as a concept.  This then gave rise to the Vedic image of the deified Kala as devourer of all things, in the sense that time devours all. Kaalratri can also mean the one who is the death of time. In the Mahanirvana Tantra, during the dissolution of the universe, Kala (time) devours the universe and is himself, engulfed by his spouse, the supreme creative force, Kali. Kālī is the feminine form of kālam (black, dark coloured) and refers to her being the entity beyond time. A nineteenth-century Sanskrit dictionary, the Shabdakalpadrum, states: कालः शिवः । तस्य पत्नीति - काली । kālaḥ śivaḥ । tasya patnīti kālī - "Shiva is Kāla, thus, his wife is Kāli"

The second part of the word kalaratri, is ratri and its origins can be traced to the oldest of Vedas, the Rig Veda.  According to the Ratrisukta of the Rig Veda, sage Kushika while absorbed in meditation realised the enveloping power of darkness and thus invoked Ratri (night) as an all-powerful goddess.  Thus, the darkness after sunset became deified and was invoked by sages to deliver mortals from fears and worldly bondage. Each period of the night, according to Tantric tradition, is under the sway of a particular terrifying goddess who grants a particular desire to the aspirant. The word kalaratriin Tantra refers to the darkness of night, a state normally frightening to ordinary individuals but considered beneficial to worshippers of the Goddess.

In latter times, Ratridevi (Goddess Ratri' or 'Goddess of the Night) came to be identified with a variety of goddesses - for example in the Atharva Veda, where Ratridevi is called Durga. Black references primal darkness before creation and also darkness of ignorance. Hence this form of goddess is considered as one who destroys the darkness of ignorance.

Invoking Goddess Kaalratri therefore empowers the devotee with the devouring quality of kala (time) and the all-consuming nature of ratri (night) - allowing all obstacles to be overcome and guaranteeing success in all undertakings. In summary, Kaalratri is the personification of the night of all-destroying time.

This form primarily depicts that life also has a dark side – the violence of Mother Nature that encompasses death and destruction.

Legends

Once there were two demons named Shumbha and Nishumbha, who invaded devaloka and defeated the demigods. Indra the ruler of the gods, along with the othergods  went to the Himalayas to get Lord Shiva's help in retrieving their abode. Together, they prayed to Goddess Parvati. Parvati heard their prayer while she was bathing, so she created another goddess, Chandi (Ambika) to assist the gods by vanquishing the demons. Chanda and Munda were two demon generals sent by Shumbha and Nishumbha.  When they came to battle her, Goddess Chandi created a dark goddess, Kali (in some accounts, called Kaalratri). Kali/Kaalratri killed them, thereby acquiring the name Chamunda.

Thereupon, a demon named Raktabija arrived. Raktabija had the boon that if any drop of blood of his fell onto the ground, a clone of him would be created. When Kaalratri attacked on him, his spilt blood gave rise to several clones of him. As such, it became impossible to defeat him. So while battling, Kaalratri furious at this, drank his blood to prevent it from falling down, eventually killing Raktabija and helping goddess Chandi to kill his commanders, Shumbha and Nishumbha. She became so fierceful and destructive that she stated killing everyone whoever coming in front of her. All the gods prayed in front of god shiva to stop her so shiv decided to come below her foot trying to stop her. When she was engaged in killing everyone, god shiva appeared below her foot. By seeing her beloved husband below her foot, she bit her tongue(Her idols and pictures contain this look) and helped him(God Shiva) to stand and in the guilt, she forgot about the fight and hence god shiva calmed her down.

Another legend says that Goddess Chamunda (Kali) was creator of Devi Kaalratri. Riding a powerful donkey, Kalraatri chased the demons Chanda and Munda and brought them to Kali after catching and incarcerating them. Then these demons were killed by goddess Chamunda. This story is closely related with another goddess named Chandamari.

She is the power of the most darkest of nights. At night, the animal kingdom take break from work and they all fall asleep. As they sleep, their exhaustion is removed. At the time of final dissolution, all the creatures of the world seek shelter, protection and refuge onto the lap of the mother goddess. She is the time of the dark night, the death-night. She is Maharatri, (the great night of the periodic dissolution) as well as Moharatri (the night of delusion). At the end of Time, when destruction makes its arrival, the goddess transforms herself into Kaalratri, who devours all Time, without leaving any remains.

Yet another legend recounts that, there was a demon named Durgasur who want to destroy world and drove away all the devas from swarg and snatched four Vedas . Parvati got to know about this and created Kaalratri, instructing her to warn Durgasur against an attack.  Durgasur's guards however tried to capture Kaalratri when she turned up as a messenger. Kaalratri then assumed a gigantic form and delivered the warning to him. Subsequently, when Durgasur came to invade Kailash, Parvati battled him and killed him gaining the name Durga. Here Kaalratri serves as an agent who gives the message and warning from Parvati to Durgasur.

The complexion of Kalaratri is that of the darkest of nights with bountiful hair and a heavenly shaped form. She has four hands - the left two hands hold a scimitar and a thunderbolt and the right two are in the varada (blessing) and abhaya (protecting) mudras. She wears a necklace that shines like the moon. Kaalratri has three eyes which emanate rays like lightning. Flames appear through her nostrils when she inhales or exhales. Her mount is the donkey, sometimes considered as a corpse. Blue, red and white colours should be used to wear on this day.

The appearance of Goddess Kaalratri can be seen as bearing doom for evil-doers. But she always bears good fruits for her devotees and should avoid fear when faced with her, for she removes the darkness of worry from life of such devotees. Her worship on the seventh day of Navratri is given especially high importance by Yogis and Sādhakas.

Prayers

Mantra 
ॐ देवी कालरात्र्यै नम:
Oṃ Devī Kālarātryai Namaḥ

मां कालरात्रि मंत्र- Maa Kalratri Mantra:

या देवी सर्वभूतेषु माँ कालरात्रि रूपेण संस्थिता
नमस्तस्यै नमस्तस्यै नमस्तस्यै नमो नम:

Dhyan Mantra 
करालवंदना धोरां मुक्तकेशी चतुर्भुजाम्। 
कालरात्रिं करालिंका दिव्यां विद्युतमाला विभूषिताम॥

Karalvandana dhoram muktkeshi chaturbhujam. 
Kaal Ratrim karalikaam divyam vidyutmala vibhushitam.

Temples
 Kalratri -Varanasi Temple, D.8/17, Kalika Galli, which is a lane parallel to Annapurna – Vishwanath
 Kaalratri Temple, Dumri Buzurg, Nayagaon, Bihar
 Kalratri -Vindhyachal, Mirzapur (UP).
 Kalratri Temple- Patiala, Punjab
 Kalratri Temple- Sangrur, Punjab

See also
 Kaal Bhairav

References

Hindu goddesses
War goddesses
Navadurgas
Durga Puja